The city of Seattle, Washington, contains many districts and neighborhoods. The city's former mayor Greg Nickels has described it as "a city of neighborhoods". Early European settlers established widely scattered settlements on the surrounding hills, which grew into neighborhoods and autonomous towns. Conurbations tended to grow from such towns or from unincorporated areas around trolley stops during the 19th and early 20th centuries; the city has consequently suffered from transportation and street-naming problems.

Definition of Seattle neighborhoods 

Seattle was established during an economic boom fueled by the timber industry; its early years were characterized by hasty expansion and development, under which residential areas were loosely defined by widely scattered plats. This arrangement was further solidified by the establishment of locally initiated community clubs, public libraries, public schools, and public parks, which created a sense of community and civic participation. At the beginning of the 20th century, Seattle's community clubs became influential in the organization of public improvements. These had a significant effect upon the character of their neighborhoods and allowed them to remain distinct from the surrounding areas. Some community clubs used covenants to restrict the ethnicity of residents.

Establishing public library branches can define districts as well as neighborhoods. Public libraries are among the most heavily used buildings. Seattle elected its city council at large from 1910 to 2014, and community clubs lobby councilors for the interests of local residents – such as for a library branch. The community organizations build a voting constituency, and in so doing define a neighborhood. In the absence of ward politics, this and campaign finance legislation are seen as more open alternatives. The Greenwood-Phinney Commercial Club was particularly active in organizing toward the Greenwood branch that opened in 1928.
The Lake City Branch Library opened in 1935 as a few shelves of books in part of a room in Lake City School, shared with the Works Progress Administration (WPA), sponsored by the Pacific Improvement Club community group. The library moved into a new building in 1955.

Elementary public schools effectively defined many neighborhoods, which are often synonymous with the name of the elementary school when the neighborhood and school were established. Many of the neighborhoods contain a few smaller neighborhoods. Mann and Minor neighborhoods in the Central District, were built around their schools. The University Heights school (1903) in the north of the University District was named for the neighborhood, as was the Latona School (1906) in Wallingford.

Parks similarly define some neighborhoods. Madrona Beach and Cowen and Ravenna Parks were privately established to encourage residential development upon otherwise unusable land. The plan for Olmsted Parks fulfilled its goal and significantly influenced the character of neighborhoods around parks and playgrounds. East Phinney and West Meridian neighborhoods are sometimes called Woodland Park, as well as South Green Lake or North Wallingford for Meridian.

Covenants and racial restrictions 
Housing covenants became common in the 1920s and were validated by the U.S. Supreme Court in 1926. Minorities were effectively limited to the International District and parts of some neighborhoods in south-east Seattle for Asian- and Native Americans; or the Central District for people of African ancestry, clearly defining those neighborhoods. Ballard – Sunset Hill, Beacon Hill, Broadmoor, Green Lake, Laurelhurst, Magnolia, Queen Anne, South Lake City, and other Seattle neighborhoods and blocks had racially or ethnically restrictive housing covenants, such as the following sample:

No person or persons of [any of several minorities] blood, lineage, or extraction shall be permitted to occupy a portion of said property ... except a domestic servant or servants who may actually and in good faith be employed by white occupants.

Further restrictions on conveyance (rental, lease, sale, transfer) were often included, effectively defining most of the neighborhoods in Seattle during the first decades after establishment.

The Supreme Court ruled in 1948 that racial restrictions would no longer be enforced. The Seattle Open Housing Ordinance became effective in 1968. Although unenforceable, legal complications prevent the covenants from being expunged from property title documents.

Wards and Little City Halls 
Seattle initially adopted a ward system; however, in 1910, this system was replaced by non-partisan, at-large representation. Variations on ward systems were proposed and rejected in 1914, 1926, 1974, 1995, and 2003 and convictions for campaign-related money laundering followed the 1995 campaign. Critics claimed that district-style elections of the city council would result in Tammany Hall-style politics. In 1973, inspired by Boston's model, Mayor Wes Uhlman's administration implemented a system of Little City Halls, where Community Service Centers (CSCs) assumed responsibility for coordinating municipal services. Uhlman's political opponents called the CSCs a thinly disguised ward system designed to promote Uhlman's reelection. CSCs became a setting for political arguments between the city council and the mayor; controversies over accountability, cronyism, and ward politics occurred in 1974, 1976, and 1988. In 1991 the CSCs were renamed Neighborhood Service Centers (NSCs) and were placed under the jurisdiction of the Department of Neighborhoods. More recently, their number has been reduced. As of 2011, there are NSCs located in Ballard, Lake City, the University District, the Central District, West Seattle, Southeast Seattle, and Delridge.

Local improvement districts 
A local improvement district (LID) is a method by which a group of property owners can share the cost of transportation infrastructure improvements. This involves improving the street, building sidewalks and installing stormwater management systems. Without Seattle's LID assessment system, the city would be unable to maintain its rapid growth in population and territory. LIDs have helped define neighborhoods by localizing decisions about issues like sidewalks, vegetation and other features of the public space, permitting neighborhoods to remain distinct from their neighbors.

Informal districts 

No official neighborhood boundaries have existed in Seattle since 1910. Districts and neighborhoods are thus informal; their boundaries may overlap and multiple names may exist for a single district. Boundaries and names can be disputed or change over time. In 2002 a Department of Neighborhoods spokeswoman said, "I've seen my area go from the 'CD' to 'Madrona' to 'Greater Madison Valley' and now 'Madrona Park.' " Some neighborhoods, such as northwest Seattle, do not have widely recognized names for their greater districts.

Throughout Seattle one can find signs indicating the boundaries of neighborhoods; the locations of these signs have been specified by the city's many community councils. However, the boundaries suggested by these signs routinely overlap and differ from delineations on maps. For example, signs indicate that Lake City Way NE is the southeastern boundary of the Maple Leaf neighborhood, while the city clerk's archival map places that district's southern boundary at 85th Street.

Another example of boundary ambiguity is "Frelard," which local residents call the area shared by Fremont and Ballard between 3rd and 8th Avenues NW. Signs facing opposite directions on NW Leary Way reveal the overlap.

Further difficulty in defining neighborhoods can result from residents' identification with neighborhoods different from those marked on signs and maps. After an acrimonious development dispute in 1966, a group of concerned Wallingford citizens enlisted the University of Washington Community Development Bureau to survey their neighborhood; the survey revealed that more residents of southwest Wallingford considered themselves citizens of Fremont than of Wallingford.

Transportation 
Minor arterial roads are generally located along the boundaries of neighborhoods, with streets and highways built according to the street classification system. These effectively help define neighborhoods.

Development in accordance with the street classification system maintains the quality of life of city neighborhoods and improves efficiency of the road system. The classification system discourages rat running through local neighborhood streets.

Transportation hubs, such as business zones and transit stations, such as Park and Ride facilities, provide focal points for districts of neighborhoods the same way trolley stops defined neighborhoods before cars.

Designated Historic Districts 
The Department of Neighborhoods designates a number of Historic Districts, which have a similar status to Seattle Landmarks.  these are:

 Ballard Avenue Landmark District
 Columbia City Landmark District
 Fort Lawton Landmark District
 Harvard-Belmont Landmark District
 International Special Review District
 Pike Place Market Historical District
 Pioneer Square Preservation District
 Sand Point Naval Air Station Landmark District
Source of list:

List of districts and neighborhoods 
Despite complications in Seattle's system of neighborhoods and districts, the names and boundaries in the following list are generally accepted and widely used. They are based on the Seattle City Clerk's Neighborhood Map Atlas, which in turn is based on a variety of sources, including a 1980 neighborhood map produced by the now-defunct Department of Community Development, Seattle Public Library indexes, a 1984-1986 "Neighborhood Profiles" feature series in the Seattle Post-Intelligencer, numerous park, land use and transportation planning studies, as well as records in the Seattle Municipal Archives.

The following table is largely based on maps from the Seattle City Clerk's Neighborhood Atlas, but also includes designations from other sources.

Annexations 
Seattle annexed eight municipalities between 1905 and 1910, nearly doubling the area size of the city. Annexations by law were begun by the annexee and had to be approved by the Seattle City Council. The appeal of the inexpensive and accessible electric power and water system services of the public utilities were the primary motivations for the annexation movements.

Ballard was its own incorporated town for 17 years, annexed as its own ward. West Seattle incorporated in 1902, then annexed Spring Hill, Riverside, Alki Point, and Youngstown districts. It was the largest of the incorporated towns to be annexed. Southeast Seattle merged the towns of Hillman City and York with other Rainier Valley neighborhoods, then incorporated for the only reason of being annexed. Similarly, the town of South Seattle consisted of mostly industrial Duwamish Valley neighborhoods (except Georgetown); one enclave adjacent to Georgetown omitted at this time was annexed 1921; some land near the river in this area remains part of unincorporated King County. In 1910 Georgetown was the last of this sequence of small incorporated cities and towns to be annexed to Seattle before the 1954 annexation of Lake City.

The following previously incorporated cities and towns were annexed by Seattle. This list is in order of annexation. Other areas annexed to Seattle, were unincorporated before annexation. Examples of the latter include the northern part of Queen Anne Hill, the University District, and the northern area of the city that were once part of then-unincorporated Shoreline.

 Town of South Seattle, incorporated 1905, annexed 20 October 1905.
 City of Columbia (Columbia City), incorporated 1892, annexed 3 May 1907
 Town of Ravenna, incorporated 1906, annexed 15 January 1907
Southeast Seattle—Hillman City, York, and other Rainier Valley neighborhoods except Columbia City—incorporated July 1906, annexed 7 January 1907
 Town of South Park, incorporated 1902, annexed 3 May 1907.
 City of Ballard, incorporated January 1890, annexed 29 May 1907
 City of West Seattle, incorporated April 1902, annexed 24 July 1907
 City of Georgetown, incorporated 1904, annexed 4 April 1910
 Lake City, incorporated township 1949, annexed January 1954

Future 

Because of the cost of providing city services, low-density residential neighborhoods represent a net revenue loss for municipalities. Because vehicle-license revenue is no longer used to subsidize unincorporated areas, these neighborhoods have become increasingly orphaned.

In April 2004, the City Council voted to defer a decision on Mayor Nickels' proposal to designate the West Hill and North Highline neighborhoods, part of unincorporated King County, as potential annexation areas (PAAs) for at least a year. Because of the tax revolt that took place in Washington in the late 1990s and early 21st century, the county's budget has been reduced and the county has said it is unlikely to be able to maintain adequate levels of funding for urban services in unincorporated areas. The nearby city of Burien, however, has issued a 2004 draft report for its own annexation of all or part of North Highline.

North Highline, which adjoins SeaTac, Burien, and Tukwila in addition to Seattle, consists of the Boulevard Park neighborhood and part of White Center. West Hill, which abuts Tukwila and Renton as well as Seattle, consists of Bryn Mawr-Skyway, Lakeridge, and Earlington. Its 2010 population is 15,645.

On December 11, 2006, the Seattle City Council agreed to designate North Highline a "potential annexation area".

See also 
 Street layout of Seattle about transportation and street naming
 110th Cascades SEA Street regarding a structure helping define a neighborhood

Notes and references

Bibliography 
 See heading, "Note about limitations of these data".
 Maps "NN-1120S", "NN-1130S", "NN-1140S".Jpg  dated 13 June; "NN-1030S", "NN-1040S".jpg dated 17 June 2002.
 Maps "NN-1120S", "NN-1130S", "NN-1140S".Jpg  dated 13 June; "NN-1030S", "NN-1040S".jpg dated 17 June 2002.
 Full city map, not titled.Maps "NN-1120S", "NN-1130S", "NN-1140S".Jpg  dated 13 June; "NN-1030S", "NN-1040S".jpg dated 17 June 2002.
 
 
 Hierarchical list of neighborhoods by districts, largely in geographical order from north to south.
 
 
 
 
 Maps "NN-1030S", "NN-1040S".jpg 17 June 2002, maps "NN-1120S", "NN-1130S", "NN-1140S".Jpg  13 June.
 Sources for this atlas and the neighborhood names used in it include a 1980 neighborhood map produced by the Department of Community Development (relocated to the Department of Neighborhoods  and other agencies), Seattle Public Library indexes (Special Collections, Seattle Collection in the Seattle Room), a 1984-1986 Neighborhood Profiles feature series in the Seattle Post-Intelligencer, numerous parks, land use and transportation planning studies, and records in the Seattle Municipal Archives.[Maps "NN-1120S", "NN-1130S", "NN-1140S".Jpg  dated 13 June 2002; "NN-1030S", "NN-1040S".jpg dated 17 June 2002.]"The Neighbors  project was published weekly in the Seattle Post-Intelligencer from 1996 to 2000. The page remained available for archival purposes for some years after being superseded by the P-I's Webtowns section.

Further reading 
 Detailed city map, Seattle City Clerk's Office Neighborhood Map Atlas. Detailed city map, otherwise not titled.Click on a number or name for the more detailed north, central, or south city map or a map of a selected neighborhood.
 Provides a language for indexing and retrieving legislation and other records in the City Clerk's Office. For more details on how to use the thesaurus, read the Introduction.
 Neighborhoods GIS source data file (Shapefile format)

Seattle
 
Seattle Neighborhoods
Seattle-related lists